Jandabup is a suburb of Perth, Western Australia, located within the City of Wanneroo. The suburb takes its name from the nearby Jandabup Lake (now a nature reserve) on the Swan Coastal Plain.

References

Suburbs of Perth, Western Australia
Suburbs of the City of Wanneroo